The 2021 FFA Cup was the eighth season of the FFA Cup, the main national soccer knockout cup competition in Australia. Thirty-two teams contested the competition proper from the round of 32, including 10 of the 12 A-League teams (with two teams not qualifying), 21 Football Australia (FA) member federation teams determined through individual state qualifying rounds, as well as the 2019 National Premier Leagues champions (Wollongong Wolves from New South Wales).

This year's competition was the final season the competition is referred to as the "FFA Cup". Following the rebranding of Football Australia from the Football Federation Australia (FFA), it was changed to "Australia Cup".

This edition also marked the first season that the winner would qualify for the AFC Champions League in the following year. However, certain teams were excluded, such as Wellington Phoenix, three other A-league teams or any teams from the National Premier Leagues.

The competition format and timing was impacted by the on-going COVID-19 pandemic in Australia.

Round and dates

Teams 
A total of 32 teams are scheduled to participate in the 2021 FFA Cup competition proper, ten of which are from the A-League Men, one the 2019 National Premier Leagues champions (Wollongong Wolves), and the remaining 21 teams from member federations, as determined by the qualifying rounds.

A-League clubs represent the highest level in the Australian league system, whereas member federation clubs come from Level 2 and below. The current season tier of member federation clubs is shown in parentheses. For the first time, the round of 32 and round of 16 were split into four geographical zones (East, South, North and West) which were determined by Football Australia.

Preliminary rounds

Member federations teams competed in various state-based preliminary rounds to win one of 21 places in the competition proper (round of 32). All Australian clubs were eligible to enter the qualifying process through their respective member federation, however only one team per club was permitted entry in the competition. The preliminary rounds operated within a consistent national structure whereby club entry into the competition is staggered in each state/territory, ultimately leading to round 7 with the winning clubs from that round gaining direct entry into the round of 32. There were changes to the make-up of the entrants compared to the 2019 edition, with South Australia increasing from 1 to 2 qualifying places, with NSW losing one place. Additionally, the top eight placed A-League clubs for the 2020–21 A-League season gained automatic qualification to the round of 32. The remaining four teams were subject to a play-off series for the remaining two positions.

The first matches of the preliminary rounds began in February 2021, with the final matches of the preliminary rounds (two A-League play-offs) completed in November.

Bracket

Round of 32
The round of 32 draw took place on 8 July 2021, with match information for zones North, South and West confirmed on 14 July 2021. Edge Hill United were the lowest-ranked side in this round. They were the only level 5 team left in the competition. After Devonport City withdrew from the competition, Avondale FC were awarded a bye to the round of 16.

Times listed below are at AEST (prior to 5 October 2021), or AEDT (after 5 October 2021)

East Zone

North Zone

South Zone

West Zone

Round of 16
Due to fixture delays as a result of COVID-19 and State border restrictions, the round of 16 draw was conducted in two parts. The first draw took place on  30 September where the winners from the North & West zones were combined into one pool to determine the three fixtures. On 15 November the remaining draw was conducted with the East & South zones remaining separated.

The lowest ranked sides that qualified for this round were Adelaide Olympic, APIA Leichhardt Tigers, Avondale FC, Gold Coast Knights, Hume City, Lions FC and Wollongong Wolves. They were the only level 2 teams left in the competition.

All times listed below are at AEDT

East Zone

North/West Zone

South Zone

Quarter-finals
The draw took place on 5 December 2021. The lowest ranked side that qualified for this round was APIA Leichhardt Tigers. They were the only level 2 team left in the competition.

All times listed below are at AEDT

Semi-finals

All times listed below are at AEDT

Final

Individual honours
The recipient of the Michael Cockerill Medal to recognise the tournament's standout National Premier Leagues performer was Finn Beakhurst from Lions FC.
Jake Brimmer from Melbourne Victory and Kye Rowles from Central Coast Mariners won the Mark Viduka Medal for the players of the match in the final, the first time in the competition's history that there's been dual recipients.

Top goalscorers

Note Goals scored in preliminary rounds not included.

Broadcasting rights
Matches were broadcast live on 10 Play. The final was broadcast on free-to-air TV through Network 10, a first for the competition.

Notes

References

External links
 Official website

Australia
2021 in Australian soccer
Australia Cup seasons